Lithia (before 1926: Κομανίτσοβον - Komanitsovon) is a village in Kastoria Regional Unit, Macedonia, Greece.

The Greek census (1920) recorded 755 people in the village and in 1923 there were 260 inhabitants (or 30 families) who were Muslim. Following the Greek-Turkish population exchange, in 1926 within Komanitsovo there were 3 refugee families from East Thrace and 20 refugee families from Pontus. The Greek census (1928) recorded 642 village inhabitants. There were 21 refugee families (76 people) in 1928.

References

Populated places in Kastoria (regional unit)